The International Berkeley Society (IBS) is a US-based organization that is aimed at promoting interest in the life and work of the philosopher Bishop George Berkeley. Its president is currently Nancy Kendrick.

Members and activities
The society was established in 1975 and now has members all over the world, among them Colin Murray Turbayne (United States),  (Germany), Katia Saporiti (University of Zurich, Switzerland), Geneviève Brykman (France, a former vice-president),  (the Czech Republic),  (Poland), Timo Airaksinen (Helsinki University, Finland, vice-president from 2006 to 2013),  (Estonia). Members pay a nominal annual fee and receive the Berkeley Briefs, an annual publication that includes news items and other announcements of interest to the Society and its members. The journal Berkeley Studies is published by Hampden-Sydney College on behalf of the society.  The IBS conducts a variety of activities, e.g. runs conferences.

Turbayne Essay Prize
The IBS annually awards the Turbayne Prize to a member of the society who has written the best essay on an aspect of Berkeley's philosophy. Recipients of the award include:
 1990, Phillip D. Cummins, University of Iowa
 1991, Robert G. Muehlmann, University of Western Ontario
 1992, Lisa Downing, University of Illinois at Chicago
 1993, George Pappas, Ohio State University
 Alan Hausman, Hunter College, CUNY
 David Hausman, Dedman College
 1995, Stephen Harris, College of William & Mary
 1999, Margaret Atherton, University of Wisconsin, Milwaukee
 2001, John Carriero, University of California at Los Angeles
 Todd Ryan, Trinity College
 2003, Michael Collins Allers, University ofMichigan y
 2005, Laurence Carlin, University of Wisconsin, Oshkosh
 2007, Jeffrey McDonough, Harvard University
 2009, Sukjae Lee, Ohio State University
 2011, Stefan Storrie, Trinity College Dublin
 2013, Thomas Curtin, Trinity College Dublin
 2015, Nancy Kendrick, Wheaton College, Massachusetts

References

External links 
 

Philosophical societies in the United States
International learned societies
Organizations established in 1975
George Berkeley
International organizations based in the United States